The Old Wire Road is a historic road in Missouri and Arkansas.  Several local roads are still known by this name.  It followed an old Native American route, the Great Osage Trail across the Ozarks and became a road along a telegraph line from St. Louis, Missouri, to Fort Smith, Arkansas.  This route was also used by the Butterfield Overland Mail. It was known as the "Wire Road" while the telegraph line was up, but when the line was later removed, it simply became known as the "Old Wire Road".  In St. Louis, where the road begins at Jefferson Barracks, it is called Telegraph Road. From St. Louis to Springfield, Missouri, it became designated Route 14 (which, in turn, later became U.S. Route 66 and still later Interstate 44).

At Springfield, it turned southwest and passed through what is now Wilson's Creek National Battlefield. From the Battlefield it meandered southwest through Christian and Stone counties in Missouri towards the Arkansas state line. It passed near Pea Ridge, Arkansas, and through Fayetteville, Arkansas, on its way to Fort Smith, Arkansas.

It was used as part of the Trail of Tears and during the Civil War, when Confederate soldiers often cut the telegraph line.

References

Native American trails in the United States
U.S. Route 66 in Missouri
Arkansas in the American Civil War
Historic trails and roads in Missouri
Historic trails and roads in Arkansas
Interstate 44
Trail of Tears
Native American history of Missouri
Native American history of Arkansas